Thrillseeker may refer to:

 Adrenaline junkie, one who appears to favor stressful activities
 Thrillseeker (roller coaster), a defunct steel roller coaster at Sea World, Australia
 Thrill Seekers (film), a 1999 science fiction movie

Music
 The Thrillseekers, an English trance DJ
 Thrill Seeker, an album by August Burns Red
 "Thrillseeker", a song by The Divine Comedy from Fin de Siècle

Sport
 Thrillseekers, the cheerleading troupe of the Rapid City Thrillers
 Thrill Seeker Holds, a climbing holds brand

See also 
 Thrill (disambiguation)
 Extreme sport